Echeveria setosa, the Mexican fire cracker, is a species of flowering plant in the family Crassulaceae, native to semi-desert areas of Mexico and common throughout Puebla.

Description
These white hairs, known as glochids, can cause irritation to the skin if touched.

Taxonomy
Echeveria setosa var. ciliata (Moran) Moran 1993
Echeveria setosa var. deminuta J. Meyrán 1989
Echeveria setosa var. minor Moran 1993
Echeveria setosa var. oteroi Moran 1993
Echeveria setosa var. setosa

Cultivation
Echeveria setosa is cultivated as an ornamental plant. It is grown outside in subtropical climates, such as Southern California. It can be placed outside during the summer months.

Etymology
Echeveria is named for Atanasio Echeverría y Godoy, a botanical illustrator who contributed to Flora Mexicana.

Setosa means 'covered with stiff, bristly hairs'.

References

External links

Endemic flora of Mexico
Flora of Puebla
Plants described in 1910
Garden plants of North America
Drought-tolerant plants
setosa